Hotel Zags Portland is a hotel in Portland, Oregon. The hotel previously operated as Portland Motor Hotel and Hotel Modera.

References

Hotels in Portland, Oregon
Southwest Portland, Oregon